Mickey Spillane's Mike Hammer is the first syndicated television series based on Spillane's hard-boiled private detective Mike Hammer, played by Darren McGavin. The series was produced from 1957 to 1959, and had a run of 78 episodes over two seasons. Episodes were filmed in black and white and filled a half-hour time slot. As a syndicated television series, original air dates and the order of episodes vary by geographic location – for example, in New York City, the series debuted January 28, 1958, on WCBS-TV, and the first episode aired was "Letter Edged in Blackmail".

Cast

Main
 Darren McGavin as Mike Hammer
 Bart Burns as Captain Pat Chambers

Recurring
 Vito Scotti as Geta
 Johnny Seven as Carl Pate
 Dale Van Sickel as Blackie Davis
 James Westerfield as Bill 'Murph' Murphy
 Patricia Huston as Mary Otto
 Walter Reed as Fred Rankin

Production and casting
Darren McGavin played the title role. McGavin would go on to play another hard-boiled private detective in the short-lived 1968 series The Outsider. He is perhaps best known as Carl Kolchak in the television series Kolchak: The Night Stalker and the curmudgeonly father in A Christmas Story. Bart Burns played Captain Pat Chambers, Hammer's main ally in the Police department.

Episodes

Season 1 (1958)

Season 2 (1959)

Home media
On September 20, 2011, A&E Home Video released Mickey Spillane's Mike Hammer: The Complete Series on DVD in Region 1 for the first time.  The 12-disc set featured all 78 episodes of the series.

Reception

Public and critical reaction to the show was mixed. While TV Guide referred to it as "easily the worst series on TV", McGavin said that the show was "instantly successful". Some reviewers were critical of the show for its use of excessive and gratuitous violence. However, McGavin made a point of playing the role of Hammer with a hint of tongue-in-cheek satire – against the wishes of Universal Studios executives.

Unlike the series that appeared in the 1980s, Mickey Spillane had minimal involvement in the production of the 1950s program. "I just took the money and went home," Spillane said of the show. "Believe me, I had bigger fish to fry, namely, that darn elusive Batmanfish."

References

External links
 

1950s American crime television series
1958 American television series debuts
1959 American television series endings
American detective television series
Black-and-white American television shows
First-run syndicated television programs in the United States
Television series by Universal Television
Mike Hammer (character) television series